CUHK Medical Centre is a non-profit teaching hospital at Ma Liu Shui, New Territories, Hong Kong, next to University station. Opened on 6 January 2021, it is a self-financed teaching hospital of the Chinese University of Hong Kong (CUHK). The hospital provides more than 500 inpatient and day beds, as well as outpatient clinics and a series of specialist diagnosis and treatment procedures. The hospital is managed and its clinical services provided by the CUHK Faculty of Medicine.

History

Background
In his 2008 Policy Address, Chief Executive Donald Tsang announced that the Hong Kong government was identifying sites for new private hospitals. In December 2009, the government invited expressions of interest in the development of private hospitals on sites in Wong Chuk Hang, Tseung Kwan O, Tai Po, and Lantau Island. In response, CUHK made a non-committal expression of interest on the Tai Po site. The university subsequently developed a proposal, but announced in 2012 that it had decided not to tender for the project as consensus could not be reached on the "details of collaboration with the potential partner".

The university subsequently began planning the development of a non-profit teaching hospital within its campus. It submitted a proposal to the government in 2014.

Funding 
On 21 August 2014, the Hong Kong Jockey Club Charities Trust donated HK$1.3 billion to support the construction of the hospital. One of the clinical blocks was thus named after the Jockey Club.

The Hong Kong government granted a loan to the CUHK Medical Centre of HK$4.033 billion. The first tranche of the loan was received on 20 March 2017.

Planning and design
The hospital site was created in the early 1980s as part of a land reclamation project that made space for construction of the Tolo Highway. The lot was vacant for many years. The university's campus master plan, published in 2010, proposed an academic building-cum-conference centre for the site.

Preliminary planning for the project was carried out by Australian firm BVN Architecture and the Architectural Design and Research Institute (AD+RG), while project management/client representation was done by Ove Arup & Partners Hong Kong. China State Construction International was responsible for design and construction engineering,  which subcontracted structural design work to Wong & Ouyang. The electrical and mechanical consultant was J. Roger Preston Limited.

Construction
Commencement of construction was marked with a groundbreaking ceremony held on 8 December 2016.

Several factors delayed the opening of the hospital. On 18 June 2019, a fire broke out at the construction site, which damaged mechanical and electrical equipment. Later in 2019, pro-democratic protest activity and the siege of the Chinese University of Hong Kong obstructed nearby roads. Beginning in January 2020, the COVID-19 outbreak in China and Europe prevented construction materials from reaching Hong Kong.

The hospital opened with limited services on 6 January 2021.

Building
It provides 516 inpatient beds, 90 day beds, 28 operating rooms, and 49 consultation rooms.

The interconnected tower blocks are arranged around two internal courtyards. Wards comprise a mix of single, double, and four-bed rooms.

Concept

The Chinese University of Hong Kong laid the groundwork for Hong Kong's first non-profit and self-financed private teaching hospital in 2014. The Chinese University Hospital is operated in a non-profit-making manner, and its proceeds will be used for the long-term development of the hospital. While preparing for the construction of the CUHK Hospital, the school also promised to accept specialist outpatient and day surgery cases referred by the Hospital Authority to relieve pressure on the public medical system. When patients are referred from a public hospital to the CUHK hospital for treatment, they only have to pay public hospital rates.

CUHK also intends to develop the hospital into Hong Kong's first "smart hospital", using advanced information technology to improve medical effectiveness, while enhancing the efficiency of the hospital's operations and improving the quality of medical services. The hospital is pursuing this goal in three aspects: an electronic medical record system, a one-stop service platform, and the use of the Internet of Things to improve efficiency.

Within the electronic medical record system, the hospital has implemented a paperless electronic medical record which covers all medical processes, including nursing records, diagnosis and treatment procedures, clinical decision-making, etc., in order to improve the effectiveness of treatment. In addition, the hospital has a one-stop service platform, which allows patients to conveniently make appointments, register, pay, view personal medical records, communicate with medical staff, and find hospital directions. In terms of the Internet of Things, CUHK Hospital applies information technology - including wireless networks, radio frequency identification (RFID), and Bluetooth - to medical operations, automating the hospital’s operational processes in order to reduce human error and facilitate communication between medical staff and patients.

Services

The hospital provides a total of 516 beds and 103 day beds, as well as 28 operating rooms, 49 consultation rooms, 16 specialized medical centers, and 24-hour outpatient services. The hospital is dominated by four-person wards, with a total of 84 wards of this type, as well as 54 double wards and 48 single rooms.

Medical services

Hospital departments

Transportation
The hospital is located next to University station and a bus terminus.

References

External links

 

2021 establishments in Hong Kong
Chinese University of Hong Kong
Hospitals established in 2021
Hospitals in Hong Kong
Ma Liu Shui